Byrathi Suresh is a member of the Indian National Congress from the state of Karnataka. He won as MLA from Hebbal constituency.

Personal life 
Suresh is married to Smt Byrathi Padmavati. They have a son and a daughter. His wife Padmavati unsuccessfully contested from Hosakote Constituency in By-elections 2019.

Career 
He began his political entry by becoming MLC in 2012. He is a close associate of former chief minister Siddaramaiah. He quit his MLC post to contest the assembly elections 2018 and got elected as MLA of Hebbal Vidhana Sabha constituency. He distributed 40000 Electronic TV to his core voter in months coming upto assemble election, with each TV with estimated to be around ₹10000. Which was funded through questionable sources of income as per Aam Aadmi Party.

References 

1972 births
Indian National Congress politicians
People from Karnataka
People from Bangalore
Living people
Karnataka MLAs 2018–2023